The 2007 Insight Bowl, part of the 2007-08 NCAA football bowl games season, was played on December 31, 2007, at Sun Devil Stadium on the Arizona State University campus in Tempe, Arizona.

The opponents were the Indiana Hoosiers of the Big Ten Conference and the Oklahoma State Cowboys of the Big 12 Conference. This was the third straight year of the Big 10 and Big 12 tie-ins for this bowl game.

Both teams had tumultuous seasons. The Hoosiers' previous head coach, Terry Hoeppner, died in June 2007 and Bill Lynch took over the program. The season-long mantra was "Play 13," as in playing a 13th game, a bowl, after the 12-game regular season.  (This is IU's first bowl since 1993.) Meanwhile, Cowboys head coach Mike Gundy became famous throughout North America for a tirade against a sportswriter for The Daily Oklahoman. The outburst was repeated many times on TV sportscasts and online. The Cowboys were 6–6 on the season and unranked nationally. Generally accepted as a disappointing year for the highly touted pre-season offense led by Zac Robinson who replaced Bobby Reid at the starting quarterback position early in the year.

References

Insight Bowl
Guaranteed Rate Bowl
Indiana Hoosiers football bowl games
Oklahoma State Cowboys football bowl games
Sports in Tempe, Arizona
Insight Bowl
Sports competitions in Maricopa County, Arizona